The Intimate Jim Reeves is an album recorded by Jim Reeves (backed by the Anita Kerr Singers and a string section) and released in 1960 on the RCA Victor label (catalog no. LPM-2216). The album was produced by Chet Atkins and arranged by Marty Gold and Cliff Parman.

In Billboard magazine's annual poll of country and western disc jockeys, it was ranked No. 6 among the "Favorite C&W Albums" of 1960.

In July 1964, the album's fourth track, "I'm Getting Better", reached No. 3 on the Billboard country and western chart.

AllMusic gave the album three-and-a-half stars, and critic Bruce Eder called it: "Superb countrypolitan pop by the man who practically invented the format, near the peak of his powers as a singer."

Track listing
Side A
 "Dark Moon" (Miller) [2:38]
 "Oh, How I Miss You Tonight" (Davis, Burke, Fisher) [2:05]
 "Take Me in Your Arms and Hold Me" (Walker) [2:44]
 "I'm Gettin' Better" (Reeves) [2:14]
 "Almost" (Toombs, McAlpin) [2:45]
 "You're Free to Go" (Robertson, Herscher) [2:00]

Side B
 "You're the Only Good Thing (That's Happened to Me)" (Toombs) [2:19]
 "Have I Stayed Away Too Long?" (Loesser) [3:01]
 "No One to Cry to" (Willing, Robin) [2:36]
 "I Was Just Walking Out the Door" (Walker) [2:12]
 "Room Full of Roses" (Spencer) [2:40]
 "We Could" (Bryant) [3:02]

See also
 Jim Reeves discography

References

1960 albums
Jim Reeves albums